Secret Rendezvous (密会, Mikkai)  is a 1977 novel by Kōbō Abe.

Synopsis
In the middle of the night, an ambulance arrives to take away a woman who appears to be completely healthy. Her husband, a sales representative for an athletic shoe company, attempts to track her whereabouts the next morning, but can find no trace of her once he arrives at the hospital.

Publication History
The English translation by Juliet Winters Carpenter was first published by Knopf in 1979.

External links
Secret Rendezvous at the Internet Archive

1977 Japanese novels
1977 speculative fiction novels
Absurdist fiction
Novels by Kobo Abe
Postmodern novels